The first recognised UCI Cyclo-cross World Championships took place in Paris (France) in 1950 and was won by Jean Robic, of France. Between 1950 and 1966 the championship was open to both amateurs and professionals. From 1967 to 1993 two separate championships were organised – one for amateurs and one for professionals. From 1994 the championship became a single event again open to all elite riders. A junior world championship was introduced in 1976. All are organized by the Union Cycliste Internationale (UCI), and the winner has the right to wear the rainbow jersey for a full year, like the winners of the world championships in other cycling disciplines.

Unlike many UCI-sanctioned races, all the World Championships are organized by nationality, not by commercial teams. The race is usually held towards the end of the season; normally January. This list does not include the Men's Amateur World Championship medal winners.

Palmarès

Medalists by country

Multiple winners

References

 
UCI Cyclo-cross World Championships